Vice Admiral Kendall Lee Card (born 15 July 1955) is a United States Navy aviator and flag officer and the former Deputy Chief of Naval Operations for Information Dominance and Director of Naval Intelligence; succeeded by Vice Admiral Ted N. Branch in July 2013.  Born in Reeves County, Texas and raised in Fort Stockton, he graduated with a BS in mechanical engineering from Vanderbilt University in 1977.  He also holds a master's degree in national security and strategic studies from the U.S. Naval War College, and is a graduate of the U.S. Naval Test Pilot School.  

He accumulated over 3,900 flight hours in the SH-3H Sea King, SH-60F Seahawk, and the S-3A Viking aircraft. Under his command, the Abraham Lincoln took part in operations Enduring Freedom, Southern Watch, and Iraqi Freedom.

He was named a flag officer in 2006, and in June 2011 was named deputy chief of naval operations for information dominance and the 64th Director of Naval Intelligence, U.S. Navy.

Awards and decorations

Card was made a Commander of the Brazilian Order of Naval Merit in June 2012. He was also awarded the National Intelligence Distinguished Service Medal.

Personal
Card is the son of Cecil Dennis Card (1 October 1927 – 12 August 2015) and Joyce Elaine (Kuykendall) Card. He has a brother and a sister.

Card married Becky Lynn Broyles on 20 August 1977 in Pecos County, Texas. They have two children and six grandchildren.

References

1955 births
Living people
People from Reeves County, Texas
People from Fort Stockton, Texas
Vanderbilt University alumni
United States Naval Aviators
United States Naval Test Pilot School alumni
Recipients of the Air Medal
Naval War College alumni
Recipients of the Legion of Merit
Directors of the Office of Naval Intelligence
United States Navy vice admirals
Recipients of the Defense Superior Service Medal
Recipients of the National Intelligence Distinguished Service Medal